Boeswarthia is a genus of snout moths. It was described by Roesler, in 1975, and contains the species Boeswarthia oberleella. It is found in China and Japan.

The wingspan is 13–16 mm.

References

Phycitinae
Monotypic moth genera
Moths of Asia